The 1954 Penn Quakers football team represented the University of Pennsylvania during the 1954 college football season.

Schedule

References

Penn
Penn Quakers football seasons
College football winless seasons
Penn Quakers football